Katarzyna Klata, née Kowalska (born 18 October 1972  in Sochaczew, Mazowieckie, Poland) is a Polish archer who was a member of the Polish squad that won the team bronze medals at the 1996 Summer Olympics. She also competed in the individual event, finishing in 25th place.

References
 Olympic profile

1972 births
Living people
Polish female archers
Olympic archers of Poland
Archers at the 1996 Summer Olympics
Olympic bronze medalists for Poland
Olympic medalists in archery
People from Sochaczew
Sportspeople from Masovian Voivodeship
Medalists at the 1996 Summer Olympics